Mentors is a Canadian science fiction fantasy series that aired on Family Channel. It was aired on Discovery Kids in the United States and Latin America. It also aired in Japan on NHK where it was dubbed in Japanese. In 2017, the first season started streaming worldwide for free on Canada Media Fund's Encore+ YouTube channel until it was shut down in 2022.

Plot
Mentors follows the adventures of 15-year-old boy genius Oliver Cates who uses his computer to bring famous historical figures such as Albert Einstein, Alexander Graham Bell, and Joan of Arc from the past into the present for 36 hours. He and his friend Dee Sampson often use the device to help cope with the challenges of being teenagers, as well as learning about history. Eventually Oliver hands the machine over to his two cousins Simon and Crystal, who bring forward figures such as Confucius, Anaïs Nin and Vlad the Impaler.

Cast
 Chad Krowchuk as Oliver Cates
 Sarah Lind as Dee Sampson
 Belinda Metz as Anne Cates
 Shaun Johnston as Roy Cates
 Stevie Mitchell as Simon Cates
 Samantha Krutzfeldt as Crystal Cates

Series overview

Episode list

Season 1 (1998–99)

Season 2

Season 3

Season 4

References

External links

1998 Canadian television series debuts
2002 Canadian television series endings
1990s Canadian children's television series
2000s Canadian children's television series
1990s Canadian science fiction television series
2000s Canadian science fiction television series
Family Channel (Canadian TV network) original programming
Canadian children's science fiction television series
Canadian children's education television series
English-language television shows
Television series about teenagers
Television shows set in Alberta
Television shows filmed in Edmonton
Canadian Screen Award-winning television shows